The Upper Rhenish Circle was an Imperial Circle of the Holy Roman Empire established in 1500 on the territory of the former Duchy of Upper Lorraine and large parts of Rhenish Franconia including the Swabian Alsace region and the Burgundian duchy of Savoy.

Many of the circle's states west of the Rhine river were annexed by France under King Louis XIV during the 17th century, sealed by the 1678/79 Treaties of Nijmegen.

Composition 

The circle was made up of the following states:

Sources 
The list of states making up the Upper Rhenish Circle is based in part on that in the German Wikipedia article Oberrheinischer Reichskreis.

External links
 Historicalmaps.com: Historical Maps of Germany — Imperial Circles in the 16th Century

 
Circles of the Holy Roman Empire
Upper Rhine
German Renaissance
Early Modern history of Germany
History of Hesse
1500 establishments in Europe
1806 disestablishments in Europe
1500s establishments in the Holy Roman Empire
1806 disestablishments in the Holy Roman Empire